The Diocese of Haderslev (Danish: Haderslev Stift) is a diocese within the Church of Denmark, established in 1922.

List of Bishops 
Ove Waldemar Ammundsen, 1923–1936
Carl Wulff Noack, 1936–1955
Frode Beyer, 1956–1964
Thyge Vilhelm Kragh, 1964–1980
Olav Christian Lindegaard, 1980–1999
Niels Henrik Arendt, 1999–2013
Marianne Christiansen, 2013–present

References 

Church of Denmark dioceses
Diocese of Haderslev
1922 establishments in Denmark